Ahmet Aydın (born 1 March 1971) is a Turkish politician of Kurdish origin from the Justice and Development Party (AKP), who has served as a Member of Parliament for Adıyaman since 22 July 2007.

Born in the district of Kahta, Adıyaman, he graduated from Istanbul University Faculty of Law and received further education at Marmara University. He worked as a freelance lawyer and also as a radiology technician at state hospitals. Married and able to speak semi-fluent English, he was elected as an AKP Member of Parliament in the 2007 general election and was re-elected in 2011 and June 2015.

See also
23rd Parliament of Turkey
24th Parliament of Turkey
25th Parliament of Turkey

References

External links
 MP profile on the Grand National Assembly website
 Collection of all relevant news items at Haberler.com

Justice and Development Party (Turkey) politicians
Deputies of Adıyaman
Members of the 25th Parliament of Turkey
Living people
People from Kâhta
1971 births
Members of the 24th Parliament of Turkey
Members of the 26th Parliament of Turkey
Deputy Speakers of the Grand National Assembly of Turkey
Istanbul University Faculty of Law alumni